The Nighttime Podcast is an investigative journalism and interview podcast hosted by Jordan Bonaparte.

The show has had over 5 million downloads on Apple Podcasts, and has been rated among the top 10 on Apple Podcast's Canadian charts.

The Nighttime Podcast deals with missing persons, mystery and the paranormal, often specializing in stories from the East Coast of Canada. Although it primarily covers topics from The Maritime Provinces of Canada, many episodes deal with missing people or mysteries from outside the region.

The show is most notable for its extended series investigating the disappearance of Emma Fillipoff. The podcast has covered this disappearance on a number of episodes. Recently, the podcast was the first to interview the perpetrator, Lindsay Souvannarath  of attempted massacre in Halifax

The show is produced in Halifax, Nova Scotia and features music scores by Vox Somnia and Paragon Cause

Brand infringement retaliation by the Subject of 'the Story of the Glove Guy' 
In a two part series titled 'GloveGuy' which investigated reports of Halifax area men being offered rides from a driver who would pressure his passenger into trying on a series of tight leather gloves in a situation that was described on the podcast as increasingly uncomfortable and in at least one case resulted in criminal charges.

Upon the release of the series, the subject of the episodes (who was referred to on air as the Glove Guy), began a trademark infringement / cyber squatting campaign as retaliation leading to a national news story.

The Nighttime Podcast has not addressed the situation on air, however in a post to their official Facebook page they explained the situation as "his (GloveGuy's) claim to ownership of Nighttime is absurd and laughable" and that "I am pursuing a remedy via a variety of agencies and am confident that this will be resolved without any complications".

Nighttime's handling of this series and the subsequent retaliation, has led to being named The Last Podcast on the Left's "Hero of the Week" in their Sept 4, 2019 episode.

Series overview

References 

Investigative journalism
Interview podcasts
2015 podcast debuts
2015 establishments in Nova Scotia
Canadian podcasts